China competed at the 1984 Summer Paralympics, held in New York City, United States and in Stoke Mandeville, United Kingdom. This was China's debut at the summer Paralympics. The country sent 24 athletes who competed in three sports: athletics, swimming, and table tennis. 

Chinese competitors won two gold medals, twelve silver, and eight bronze, placing China 23rd on the medal table. Ping Yali won China's first ever Paralympic gold medal.

Medalists

See also
China at the Paralympics
China at the 1984 Summer Olympics
Sports in China

References

External links
New York 1984 Press Release - IPC
International Paralympic Committee
National Paralympic Committee of China (NPCC) - short introduction

Nations at the 1984 Summer Paralympics
1984
Paralympics